Judith Flemig-Pelzer (born 22 May 1979) is a former German female volleyball player. She was part of the Germany women's national volleyball team. In 1999 she was the German Volleyball Player of the Year.

She competed with the national team at the 2000 Summer Olympics in Sydney, Australia, finishing 6th.

See also
 Germany at the 2000 Summer Olympics

References

External links
 
cev.lu
leverkusen.com
munzinger.de
volleywood.net
volleyball.de
greenflamesports.de

1979 births
Living people
German women's volleyball players
Sportspeople from Neuss
Volleyball players at the 2000 Summer Olympics
Olympic volleyball players of Germany
21st-century German women
20th-century German women